The Church of the Intercession of the Holy Virgin was an Old Believers church in Novocherkassk, Rostov Oblast, Russia. It was built in 1908 in Eclecticist style.

History
At the beginning of the 20th century, after the promulgation of October Manifesto in 1905, which granted citizens of the Russian Empire freedom of conscience, the Old Believers of Novocherkassk decided to build their own church in the city. The law of 1906 on freedom of religion also eased their position.

Dmitry Fedorovich Baidalakov donated his farmstead with two stone houses on Pochtovaya Street for the construction of the new church, which was completed in 1907. The interior painting was carried out by artist Ivan Fyodorovich Popov, who also took part in the painting of Novocherkassk Cathedral. Inside the church, according to contemporaries, there was a beautiful blue iconostasis. On October 26, 1908, the consecration of Old Believer church was done by the Old Believer Archbishop Ioann Kartushin, who arrived from Moscow and was assisted by Bishop Theodosius. The ceremony was also attended by state officials, including General Alexander Samsonov.

After October Revolution the church was destroyed. On the very same Pochtovaya Street, at 300 meters from each other there were two St. Nicholas churches: an Orthodox one on Nikolskaya Square (now Levski Square), and an Old Believer one in the Alexander Garden. Both of them were also destroyed.

References

Churches in Rostov Oblast
Old Believer movement
Churches completed in 1908
Demolished churches in the Soviet Union
Buildings and structures in Novocherkassk